The Arch Creek Petroglyphs, also known as Site 48CK41 are Native American rock art figures located in Crook County, Wyoming. The site, in the southern Black Hills, is unusual in featuring comparatively long, narrow line figures incised on the rock, compared to more common V-necked anthropomorphs and shield figures. The site is particularly well preserved and is protected.

The site was placed on the National Register of Historic Places in 1986.

References

External links
 Arch Creek Petroglyphs at the Wyoming State Historic Preservation Office

Archaeological sites on the National Register of Historic Places in Wyoming
Geography of Crook County, Wyoming
Petroglyphs in Wyoming
National Register of Historic Places in Crook County, Wyoming